Suryaveer Singh (23 December 1936 – 6 August 2002) was an Indian first-class cricketer. His brother Hanumant Singh, cousin Kumar Indrajitsinhji, uncle Kumar Shri Duleepsinhji and great uncle Kumar Shri Ranjitsinhji, all played Test cricket. An opening batsman and wicketkeeper, he succeeded as Maharawal of Banswara in April 1985.

Suryaveer Singh made his first class debut for Madhya Pradesh in 1958-59. The following season he joined his brother Hanumant in the Rajasthan side with whom he became a regular throughout the 1960s. Rajasthan made the Ranji Trophy final seven times with Suryaveer in the team, although they lost all of them to Bombay. The 1966-67 final in particular was memorable for Singh as he contributed innings of 79 and 132, many of the runs coming in partnership with his brother who scored 109 and 213 not out. 
 
At the age of 65 he was killed along with his daughter and two sisters in a car accident.

References

External links

1936 births
2002 deaths
Indian cricketers
Madhya Pradesh cricketers
Rajasthan cricketers
Central Zone cricketers
Wicket-keepers